Herbert Strabel (14 October 1927 – 21 October 2017) was a German production designer, art director and set decorator. He won an Academy Award in the category Best Art Direction for the film Cabaret. He died a week after his 90th birthday.

Selected filmography
 My Daughter and I (1963)
 Cabaret (1972)

See also
 List of German-speaking Academy Award winners and nominees

References

External links

1927 births
2017 deaths
German production designers
German art directors
German set decorators
Best Art Direction Academy Award winners
Artists from Berlin
Film people from Berlin